

The Vimuttimagga ("Path of Freedom") is a Buddhist practice manual, traditionally attributed to the Arahant Upatissa (c. 1st or 2nd century). It was translated into Chinese in the sixth century as the Jietuo dao lun 解脫道論 by Sanghapala. The original text (possibly Pali or Buddhist Hybrid Sanskrit) is no longer extant, but the work has survived in Chinese. The book was probably written in India and then later brought to Sri Lanka. Some doctrines of the Vimuttimagga have been associated with those attributed to the Abhayagiri monastery by Dhammapāla, but this has been disputed in recent scholarship.

Contents 
The Vimuttimagga recommends various meditation practices such as Anapanasati, Kasina meditation and Buddha-anussati - recollection of the virtues of the Buddha. Its chapters are (based on the translation by Ehara, Soma & Kheminda):
 Introductory Discourse (referencing the three trainings and ultimate freedom)
 On Distinguishing Virtue
 On Austerities
 On Distinguishing Concentration
 On Approaching a Good Friend
 The Distinguishing of Behavior
 The Distinguishing of the Subjects of Meditation
 Entrance into the Subject of Meditation
 The Five Forms of Higher Knowledge
 On Distinguishing Wisdom
 The Five Methods (aggregates, sense organs, elements, conditioned arising, truth)
 On Discerning Truth

Relationship to the Visuddhimagga 
The Vimuttimagga bears a striking similarity to the Visuddhimagga by Buddhaghosa, and it is highly probable that it had an influence on Buddhaghosa. While the Visuddhimagga is a much longer work, both texts differ on several points. According to Bhikkhu Analayo, the Chinese version of the Vimuttimagga states that ascetic practices (dhutanga) can be unwholesome and wholesome while the Visuddhimagga denies that they can be unwholesome, although he notes that the Tibetan Vimuktimārga classifies ascetic practices as "wholesome". A similar difference can be seen with regards to concentration (samādhi) which the Vimuttimagga states can be wholesome or unwholesome (micchā samādhi/邪定) while the Visuddhimagga disagrees that it can be unwholesome. Another major difference is in the scheme of the progress of insight, which the Vimuttimagga arranges based on the Four Noble Truths and the Visuddhimagga arranges based on the seven purifications which stem from the Rathavinīta-sutta.

Minor differences can also be seen in the particular schemes of practice. Upatissa gives four categories of Śīla while Buddhagosa gives five. Upatissa gives four ways of cultivating Anapanasati, while Buddhagosa gives eight. In addition, the Visuddhimagga identifies forty subjects of meditation (kammatthana) while the Vimuttimagga identifies thirty-eight.

See also
 Buddhaghosa
 Visuddhimagga
 Patisambhidamagga
 Samatha
 Vipassanā

Notes

References

External links

English translations
The Path to Freedom, Vimuttimagga (Volume I & II) Translated by Bhikkhu N. Nyanatusita. Centre of Buddhist Studies, The University of Hong Kong, 2021.
The Path Of Freedom (Vimuttimagga) of Arahant Upatissa Translated from the Chinese by Rev. N. R. M. Ehara, Soma Thera, Kheminda Thera. Buddhist Publication Society. Kandy, Ceylon
Vimuttimagga and Visuddhimagga by P. V. Bapat

Pali Buddhist texts